"Pot of Gold" is a song by American rapper and West Coast hip hop artist Game featuring vocals from R&B singer Chris Brown, released on June 28, 2011 as the second single from Game's fourth studio album The R.E.D. Album. The artists co-wrote the song with its producers, The Futuristics, with extra writing from Sam Hook, who is signed to R&B singer Ne-Yo's Compound Entertainment label.

The hip hop song features a music sample of the song "Rocketship" performed by rock band Guster from their second album Goldfly (1997). "Pot of Gold" was originally leaked back in early April, 2011 but was then fully remastered to a new version. Unlike the album's first single, the controversial and less successful "Red Nation", "Pot of Gold" managed to attain some Billboard and worldwide chart success.

Background
Although confirmed that the album's second official single would be "Bottles & Rockin' J's" which is produced by Lex Luger, and features DJ Khaled, Busta Rhymes, Rick Ross, Fabolous & Lil Wayne, it was later changed. Later on June 22, 2011 it was confirmed that the album's new second official single would be "Pot of Gold", in which it features guest vocal performance from R&B singer Chris Brown.

"Pot of Gold" was written by Game, Chris Brown and Sam Hook a songwriter signed to R&B singer Ne-Yo's Compound Entertainment record label, and it was produced by Los Angeles-based production/writing duo The Futuristics, noted for working with many recording artists including Chris Brown, Ne-Yo, Lady Gaga and Justin Timberlake, among others.

The song features a music sample of the song "Rocketship" performed by rock band Guster from their second album Goldfly (1997). "Pot of Gold" was originally leaked back in early April, 2011 but was then fully remastered to a new version.

Critical reception
Scott Shetler of PopCrush gave the song a positive review, saying it's "A sensitive, introspective message from Game" and "Instead, simple guitar strumming and a gentle beat carry the song, making it a likely candidate to cross over and connect with pop audiences". Dean Silfen of AOL Radio also gave the song a positive review, saying "The chemistry between Brown and Game make this track a true hit. Brown plays the sentimental one, making the listener sympathize with the song's message, while Game gives the song its street sensibility".

Music video
The video for the single was shot on June 28, 2011, filmed at an abandoned East Los Angeles residence, it is said that the Bryan Barber-directed clip is a retrospective of Game’s own life growing up in Compton, California. In one nostalgic scene, he raps in an attic with posters of Tupac Shakur & Snoop Dogg and N.W.A, reminiscing on simpler days. Chris Brown arrived later in the evening to shoot his scenes. The music video for the single was officially released on July 25, 2011.

Formats and track listings
 Digital download
 "Pot of Gold" featuring Chris Brown – 3:25

Credits and personnel
The credits for "Pot of Gold" are adapted from the liner notes of The R.E.D. Album.
Recording
 Recorded at: Pacifque Studios in North Hollywood, Los Angeles.

Personnel
 Game – songwriting, vocals
 Chris Brown – vocals
 The Futuristics - producers
 Samuel Kalandjian – recording
 Fabian Marasciullo - mixing
 Brian "Big Bass" Gardner - mastering
 Ryan Miller - songwriting
 Adam Gardner - songwriting
 Brian Rosenworcel - songwriting

Chart performance

Radio and release history

Radio release

Purchasable release

References

External links

2010 songs
2011 singles
The Game (rapper) songs
Chris Brown songs
Interscope Records singles
Pop ballads
Contemporary R&B ballads
Music videos directed by Bryan Barber
Songs written by Chris Brown
Songs written by The Game (rapper)
DGC Records singles
Song recordings produced by the Futuristics
Songs written by Joe Khajadourian
Songs written by Alex Schwartz